Parasat Cable Television (stylized upper case as PARASAT with a satellite dish icon) is a Philippine cable television operator billed as Mindanao's only digital television system and fiber broadband internet provider. It is based in Cagayan de Oro city and started as an electronic retail store and repair shop established by Elpidio Paras. It was known as Paras Industrial Systems.

References

Cable television companies of the Philippines
Companies based in Cagayan de Oro
Telecommunications companies established in 1991
1991 establishments in the Philippines